Kendujhargarh railway station, located in the Indian state of Odisha, serves Kendujhar (formerly called Keonjhar) in Kendujhar district. It is on the Padapahar–Jakhapura branch line.

History
Construction of the line between Jakhapura and Daitari was sanctioned in 1976–77. It was commissioned in 1981. The -long Daitari–Banspani line was sanctioned in 1992–93 to facilitate transportation of iron ore for export through Paradip Port. The Banspani–Kendujhar  section was operational in 2004. The Kendujhar–Tomka section was operational in 2007. Passenger trains started operating on this route in 2009.

Geography
The area is a largely forested plateau.

Trains
Among the trains available at Kendujhar are Barbil–Puri Express and Kendujhar–Bhubaneswar Fast Passenger which are now running daily. Also a VSKP–TATA–VSKP Weekly Express is added on this route. More number of Passenger and Express trains is the requirement of Keonjhar. Comparison to other populated areas it has only one daily train to Bhubaneswar. With the existing rush clearly there is requirement of three more daily trains to Bhubaneswar from here it can either passenger or Express. Local trains are need to connect KDJR to Joda and Barbil which are nearest towns and popular destinations of this district.

Running train list:

 18416/18415 PURI–BARBIL–Rourkela – PURI intercity
 58425/ 58426 KDJR–BBS Fast Passenger
 20816/20815 VSKP–TATA–VSKP Superfast Express
 07438/07439 Ranchi -Villupuram Super fast Express 
 08189/08190 Tatanagar–Visakhapatnam–Tatanagar Special Fare Special

References

Railway stations in Kendujhar district
Railway junction stations in India
Khurda Road railway division
Railway stations opened in 2009